Emma Pollock (born 20 December 1972) is a Scottish singer-songwriter, musician, and a founding member of the bands the Delgados and the Burns Unit. She is also one of the founders of The Fruit Tree Foundation project and a regular contributor to Vox Liminis.

Career
A founding member of the Delgados, Pollock signed a solo recording contract with British independent record label 4AD in 2005 after the amicable break-up of the band. Her debut solo studio album, Watch the Fireworks, was released on 17 September 2007. Pollock has most recently been recording with Scottish-Canadian band the Burns Unit, along with Indo-Caledonian pop artist Future Pilot A.K.A., Karine Polwart, King Creosote, multi-instrumentalist Kim Edgar, drummer and producer Mattie Foulds, pianist Michael Johnston; and rapper MC Soom T. Pollock has also worked with David Gedge both in the studio and live as part of his Cinerama project.

On 3 August 2010, the Burns Unit released their debut studio album, Side Show, through Proper Distribution in the UK. Produced by the band's drummer Mattie Foulds, Side Show was mixed with Paul Savage and mastered by Jon Astley.

Pollock's third solo studio album, In Search of Harperfield, was released on 29 January 2016 on Chemikal Underground.

Personal life
Pollock studied laser science and optoelectronics at the University of Strathclyde, graduating BSc (Hons) in 1993.

Pollock is married to musician and producer Paul Savage, also of the Delgados, and they have a son.

Discography
Studio albums
 Watch the Fireworks (17 September 2007)
 The Law of Large Numbers (1 March 2010)
 In Search of Harperfield (29 January 2016)

Singles and EPs
 "Adrenaline" (28 May 2007)
 "Acid Test" (3 September 2007)
 "Paper and Glue" (26 November 2007)
 "I Could Be a Saint" (22 February 2010)
 "Red Orange Green" (24 May 2010)
 "Parks and Recreation" (22 January 2016)

Other releases
 Side Show with Scottish and Canadian collective the Burns Unit (2010)
 Tour EP with RM Hubbert (Oct 2012)

Music videos
 "Adrenaline" (2007, directed by Blair Young)
 "Acid Test" (2007, directed by Lucy Cash)
 "Paper and Glue" (2007, directed by Moh Azima)
 "Red Orange Green" (2010, directed by Laura McCullagh)
 "Parks and Recreation" (2016, directed by Virginia Heath)

References

External links
 Official website
 
 
 

1972 births
British indie rock musicians
Living people
21st-century Scottish women singers
Scottish singer-songwriters
4AD artists
Alumni of the University of Strathclyde
Scottish rock singers
Musicians from Glasgow
Scottish folk musicians
Chemikal Underground artists
20th-century Scottish women singers